Klant is a Dutch language surname. Notable people with the name include:

 Joop Klant (1915–1994), Dutch economist
 Josef Klant (1869–1927), first Gauleiter of Hamburg

References 

Dutch-language surnames